Muna Madan is a 2003 Nepalese tragic romance film, directed by Gyanendra Deuja. The film is based on novel of the same name written by Laxmi Prasad Devkota. The film is produced by Nabaraj Dhakal under the banner of N.B.A. Chalchitra. The film stars Deepak Tripathi, and Usha Poudel in the lead roles alongside Subhadra Adhikari, Vijaya Lama, Mithila Sharma, Neer Shah, Dinesh D.C., and Shivahari Poudel. The film was selected as the Nepalese entry for the Best Foreign Language Film at the 76th Academy Awards but it wasn't nominated.

Plot 

The movie describes the life of a man (Madan) who leaves his wife (Muna) and goes to Lhasa to make money. Madan represents all the youths of Nepal who go abroad to earn money to earn their living.
The wife of Madan, Muna is the queen of love and sacrifice. She loves her Madan a lot so she is upset as she has to send him to a place, Lhasa, where there are lots of obstacles and risks. But finally, she accepts this challenge and stays in the country with her mother-in-law who is old and weak.
While returning home, Madan becomes sick on the way. His friends leave him on the road and come back home saying he has died. Finally, he is rescued by a man who is considered to be of a lower caste in Nepal. That is why it is said that a man is said to be great not by caste or race but by a heart full of love and humanity.
When Madan returns to Kathmandu after regaining his health, he discovers that his mother and his beloved wife had already died. Madan comes to realize that money is of no value at that point.

Cast 
 Deepak Tripathi as Madan
 Usha Poudel as Muna
 Mithila Sharma as Didi
 Capt. Vijaya Lama as Sherpa
 Subhadra Adhikari as Madan's mother
Dinesh D.C. as Kaji
Neer Shah as Malik

Soundtrack

References 

.

External links 
 

Nepalese romantic drama films